Loanends is a hamlet located in the townlands of Grange of Carmavy and Ballymather Lower, near Antrim in County Antrim, Northern Ireland. The settlement's name derives from the term 'loan-end', which translates to 'lane-end', and there are three minor roads that are quite close to each other that form Loanends. The hamlet has a Presbyterian Church, a church hall, a primary school and an Orange hall.

References

Geography of Northern Ireland